Stenogobius is a genus of fish in the goby subfamily, Gobionellinae. They are native to fresh, brackish and marine waters along the coasts of the Indian and Pacific Oceans. They are known commonly as coastal stream gobies.

The genus is divided into two subgenera. Subgenus Stenogobius have varied coloration and scale arrangements, and Insularigobius species are strongly sexually dimorphic.

Species
There are currently 27 recognized species in this genus:
 Stenogobius alleni Watson, 1991
 Stenogobius beauforti (M. C. W. Weber, 1907) (Beaufort's goby)
 Stenogobius blokzeyli (Bleeker, 1860)
 Stenogobius caudimaculosus Watson, 1991
 Stenogobius fehlmanni Watson, 1991
 Stenogobius genivittatus (Valenciennes, 1837) (chinstripe goby)
 Stenogobius gymnopomus (Bleeker, 1853)
 Stenogobius hawaiiensis Watson, 1991
 Stenogobius hoesei Watson, 1991
 Stenogobius ingeri Watson, 1991
 Stenogobius keletaona Keith & Marquet, 2006 (Keletaona's Goby)
 Stenogobius kenyae J. L. B. Smith, 1959 (Africa rivergoby)
 Stenogobius kyphosus Watson, 1991
 Stenogobius lachneri G. R. Allen, 1991 (Bintuni goby)
 Stenogobius laterisquamatus (M. C. W. Weber, 1907)
 Stenogobius macropterus (Duncker, 1912)
 Stenogobius marinus Watson, 1991
 Stenogobius marqueti Watson, 1991
 Stenogobius mekongensis Watson, 1991
 Stenogobius ophthalmoporus (Bleeker, 1853)
 Stenogobius polyzona (Bleeker, 1867) (chinestripe goby)
 Stenogobius psilosinionus Watson, 1991 (teardrop goby)
 Stenogobius randalli Watson, 1991
 Stenogobius squamosus Watson, 1991
 Stenogobius watsoni G. R. Allen, 2004
 Stenogobius yateiensis Keith, Watson & Marquet, 2002 (Yaté's goby)
 Stenogobius zurstrassenii (Popta, 1911)

References

 
Gobionellinae
Taxonomy articles created by Polbot